The New Actors Workshop was a two-year acting conservatory in New York City founded by Master Teachers Mike Nichols, George Morrison and Paul Sills in 1988. The school offered a unique, dual-track curriculum combining Stanislavski-based technique with Viola Spolin Theater Games.  The workshop stopped accepting students in 2010.

The founders
Sills, Morrison, and Nichols enjoyed a long association dating back to the 1950s at the University of Chicago. Their experience convinced them that there was a unique value for the actor in the double challenge of performance improvisation and Stanislavski-based training, and they founded The Workshop specifically to offer this powerful experience to a new generation of actors.

Performances 
There were different types of performances throughout the year in which students participated.

Friday Night Improv 
Students of the workshop played Spolin theatre games for an audience. These shows were free and open to the public.

Scene Nights 
At the end of their first year, students performed for family and friends in a New Actors Workshop Scene Night.

Story Theatre 
At the end of their second year, students went into a rehearsal period with a guest director.  This production was most often a Story Theater show, a genre invented by Paul Sills in the 1960s.  Guest directors  included Paul Sills, Gene Hackman, Diane Paulus, Shira Piven, David Turner, Lester Thomas Shane, K Tanzer, Carol Sills

Notable alumni
 Diane Paulus, director Hair (musical)
 Ricki Noel Lander, actress
 Kim D'Armond, actress

References

Drama schools in the United States
1988 establishments in New York City
Universities and colleges in New York City
Theatre in New York City